Splitsvilla 11, styled as Splitsvilla XI, is the eleventh season of the Indian reality TV series MTV Splitsvilla. It premiered on 5 August 2018 on MTV India. Hosted by Sunny Leone and Rannvijay Singh. The show consisted of ten boys and nine girls who came to play game of love. Shot in Jim Corbett National Park following the previous season, the theme of the season was "Happily (N)Ever After" or "Happily Ever After....Or Never After?". The season was won by Gaurav Alugh and Shruti Sinha
 whereas Shagun Pandey and Samyuktha Hegde emereged as first runner-up.

Contestants

 
  indicates the original splitsvilla contestants. 
  indicates the wild card contestants

References

External links 

Official website

Indian reality television series
2008 Indian television series debuts
MTV (Indian TV channel) original programming
Hindi-language television shows
Flavor of Love
Dating and relationship reality television series
2010s Indian television series